Wes Taylor may refer to:
Wes Taylor (politician)
Wesley Taylor, actor and writer
A fictional character in the film 2 Days in the Valley